The 1970 Speedway World Pairs Championship was the first FIM Speedway World Pairs Championship. The final took place in Malmö, Sweden. The championship was won by New Zealand (28 points) who beat Sweden (25 points) and England (19 points).

Semifinal 1
  Manchester
 May 6

Semifinal 2
  Maribor
 May 17

World final
  Malmö, Malmö Stadion
 June 2

Notes:
a. The Danish team weren't classified, because they were track reserve team who replaced Poland.

See also
 1970 Individual Speedway World Championship
 1970 Speedway World Team Cup
 motorcycle speedway
 1970 in sports

References

1970
World Pairs